Meroo National Park is a national park in on South Coast of New South Wales, Australia.

History
Meroo has only recently been designated as a National Park. Previously it was a state forest which contained an unregulated camp ground with beautiful beaches and bushland. The area was badly damaged over ten years ago by bushfires. Because of this damage and its constant use by holiday goers the National Park lands authority decided to create a National Park on this State Forest land in an attempt to help regenerate the bushland.

Description
As well as the beaches there are tidal rockpools and a rocky island that can be reached at low tide.  Many sea creatures can be found such as crabs, star fish, small fish and sea urchins.  Since its creation as a National Park new rules and regulations have been brought in to increase care of the natural bushland and native fauna. Fenced off areas around the headlands to stop erosion have been created and areas for camping have been reduced. This has helped to increase the natural bush regenerate from the devastating fires. The park's wildlife appears to be increasing in numbers with wallabies and possums being seen regularly. The sound of native birds can be heard again too.  The park forms part of the Ulladulla to Merimbula Important Bird Area, identified as such by BirdLife International because of its importance for swift parrots.

Meroo is home to 12 endangered wildlife species, including the nationally endangered green and golden bell frog. 

The average elevation of the terrain is 55 meters above sea level.

See also
 Protected areas of New South Wales (Australia)

References

National parks of New South Wales
2001 establishments in Australia
Important Bird Areas of New South Wales
Protected areas established in 2001